is a Japanese photographer.

References

Japanese photographers
1935 births
Living people
People from Shinagawa
20th-century Japanese photographers